Zone Thriller was a television channel in Europe that launched on 3 July 2006. The channel aired a number of varying movie styles including psychological dramas and murder mysteries.

On 14 September 2009, it was revealed that the international arm of CBS, CBS Studios International, struck a joint venture deal with Chellomedia to launch six CBS-branded channels in the UK during 2009. The new channels would replace Zone Romantica, Zone Thriller, Zone Horror and Zone Reality, plus timeshift services Zone Horror +1 and Zone Reality +1. On 1 October 2009, it was announced that CBS Reality, CBS Reality +1, CBS Drama and CBS Action would launch on 16 November 2009 replacing Zone Reality, Zone Reality +1, Zone Romantica and Zone Thriller. On 5 April 2010, Zone Horror and Zone Horror +1 were rebranded as Horror Channel and Horror Channel +1, following the rebrand of the portfolio's other three channels in November 2009.

Past programming
This is a list of programs that was previously broadcast by Zone Thriller.

 18 Wheels Of Justice
 Adventure Inc.
 Good Morning Psychic
 Remington Steele
 Starsky & Hutch
 The Pretender
 The Bourne Identity
 La Femme Nikita
 Twisted
 The Fugitive (2000) TV remake
 Queen of Swords
 Detective Conan

References

External links
Zone Thriller

AMC Networks International
Television channels and stations established in 2006
Television channels and stations disestablished in 2009
Defunct television channels in the United Kingdom

pl:CBS Drama